CE Sabadell (femení) is the women's football team of CE Sabadell. It is the women's section of CE Sabadell.

History
CE Sabadell was one of the founding members of the Spanish league in 1988.

Fifteen years later they won their first national title, the 2003 Copa de la Reina. The following season Sabadell were the runners-up in the league, and again reached the Copa's final, which this time they lost to Levante UD in the extra time.

However, this golden era was short-lived and the team withdrew from the competition in 2005 after collapsing financially.

For the 2013-14 season, CE Sabadell will plays in Catalonia's Preferent category (T3).

Stadium
CE Sabadell (women) plays home games at Poliesportiu Olímpia.

Titles

 Primera División
Runners-up 2003–04: 1
 Copa de la Reina
Winners 2002–03: 1
Runners-up 1991–92, 2003–04: 2

Season to season

Current squad
As of 1 January 2018.

Former internationals

  Sonia Bermúdez
  Priscila Borja
  Marta Cubí
  Susana Guerrero
  Adriana Martín
  Yolanda Mateos
  Ángeles Parejo
  Laura del Río

References

External links
Official website

CE Sabadell FC
Women's football clubs in Spain
Football clubs in Catalonia